Terry Lane, born Terry Turnage Jr., is an American R&B artist active since 2009.  Lane has been performing under his stage name "Cazual" until November 2014.

Early life

Terry Lane was born and raised in the Atlanta area, where he developed his interest in music. Lane started singing at the age of seven, but announced himself officially at the age of 20. After moving to Texas Lane has served in the United States Army.

Music career

Terry Lane has worked with Tom Davis Productions and artists like Chalie Boy, Rich Boy, Soulja Boy, Trey Songz and Plies. His upcoming VEVO album 'Addiction' has been announced for release in February 2015.

Lane's music is mainly influenced by music genres like jazz, pop, and R&B. His debut single "Let Me Get It" was released in 2012. Terry Lane is a VEVO artist since 2014.

On October 13, 2019, Terry Lane announced that he had signed with Ruby Recordings.

On October 29, 2019, Terry Lane interviewed with Respect Magazine on the release of his latest album "Addiction".

References

Living people
American contemporary R&B singers
Year of birth missing (living people)
21st-century African-American male singers